Rheinpark Stadion in Vaduz is the national stadium of Liechtenstein.  It plays host to home matches of the Liechtenstein national football team, and is also the home of football club FC Vaduz. It lies on the banks of the river Rhine, just metres from the border with Switzerland.

Rheinpark was officially opened on 31 July 1998 with a match between FC Vaduz, the Liechtenstein Cup holders at the time, and 1. FC Kaiserslautern, the then Bundesliga champions. 1. FC Kaiserslautern won 8–0.

The stadium has a seating capacity of 5,873, with additional standing room space giving it a total capacity of 7,584. The stadium cost 19 million CHF to construct.

In 2006, the stadium was upgraded with the South and North grandstands gaining covers, and improvements to the training facilities. In June 2007, the stadium hosted concerts by Clueso and Herbert Grönemeyer.

See also
 List of football stadiums in Liechtenstein

References

External links

Liechtenstein FA website
FC Vaduz website 
FC Vaduz stadium information 

1998 establishments in Liechtenstein
Buildings and structures completed in 1998
FC Vaduz
Buildings and structures in Vaduz
Football venues in Liechtenstein
National stadiums